Nogometni klub Brda Dobrovo, commonly referred to as NK Brda or simply Brda, is a Slovenian football club from Dobrovo. The team competes in the Slovenian Third League, the third highest league in Slovenia. The club was founded in 1973.

Stadium
Vipolže Stadium is located in Vipolže. It has a capacity for 600 spectators.

Honours
Slovenian Third League
 Winners: 1999–2000, 2015–16

MNZ Nova Gorica Cup
 Winners: 2011–12, 2012–13, 2013–14, 2014–15, 2015–16, 2016–17, 2018–19

League history since 1991

References

External links
Official website 
Soccerway profile
Worldfootball profile

Association football clubs established in 1973
Football clubs in Slovenia
1973 establishments in Slovenia